Meir Medical Center (Merkaz Refu'i Me'ir) is regional hospital  in Kfar Saba, Israel.  It is the seventh largest hospital complex in the country, and is part of a network of hospitals owned and operated by Clalit Health Services.

History 

The medical facility in Kfar Saba was opened to the public on July 15, 1956, as a hospital for tuberculosis and diseases of the respiratory system. Later in 1962, Meir was  turned  into a general hospital and is now part of the Sapir Medical Center. Clalit Health Services (formerly known as Kupat Holim Clalit) built the original hospital thanks to the pivotal influence of Dr. Alfred Grünebaum.

Meir Hospital serves the ethnically diverse communities of the highly-populated eastern Sharon plain, including Israeli Arab patients from the Triangle towns and villages. The hospital is named after Dr. Josef Meir (1890–1955), the first head of Kupat Holim Clalit and director of the ministry of health of pre-state Israel. Meir was a strong opponent of the elitist private health care then prevailing and stated that medicine should be organized as an equal public service aimed at improving health levels of the population at large.

Services 
Meir Hospital teaching departments are affiliated with the Sackler School of Medicine, Tel Aviv University, while laboratories are affiliated to Bar Ilan University. Meir Medical Center specializes in the treatment of pulmonary diseases and spinal surgery and is accredited under the JCI. It is the base hospital for the Israeli Olympic team.
 717 beds for hospitalization
 60 seats in the outpatient clinic
 57 seats for admission to hospital births
 28 sites to undergo dialysis
 122 clinics

Institutes
 Gastroenterology
 Oncology
 Nephrology
 Radioisotope Medicine

See also
Health care in Israel

References

External links

Meir Medical Center. (Hebrew official website)
Meir Medical Center. (Russian official website)
Treatment in Israel. Meir Medical Center.

Hospital buildings completed in 1956
Hospitals established in 1956
Hospitals in Israel
Buildings and structures in Central District (Israel)
Kfar Saba
Tuberculosis sanatoria
1956 establishments in Israel